Ganesh Dāmodar Sāvarkar (13 June 1879 – 16 March 1945), also called Babarao Savarkar, was an Indian politician, activist, nationalist, and founder of the Abhinav Bharat Society.

Ganesh was the eldest of the Savarkar brothers, Ganesh, Vinayak, and Narayan, they also had a sister Mainabai, who was the penultimate child of their parents, Narayan being the youngest. His parents' death laid the liability of his family at an age of twenty years.

He led an armed movement against the British colonial government in India, he was sentenced to transportation for life as a result. The then collector of Nasik, A. M. T. Jackson was assassinated by Anant Laxman Kanhere in retaliation. Dhananjay Keer describes Jackson as "part of the oppressive machinery of the British Empire" and "...responsible for deporting Babarao..."

M. J. Akbar writes that "The five friends who started the RSS were B. S. Moonje, L. V. Paranjpe, Dr. Tholkar, Babarao Savarkar and Hedgewar himself". Rity Kohli writes that Savarkar's essay on nationalism "Rashtra Mimansa" was abridged into "We, and our Nationhood, Defined", by Golwalkar, in 1938, which was the first systematic statement of the Rashtriya Swayamsevak Sangh ideology.

References 

1879 births
1945 deaths
People from Nashik district
Marathi people
Indian independence activists
Politicians from British India